Emily Rix (born February 28, 1979 in Toronto, Ontario) is a field hockey player from Canada. Rix usually played midfield.

International Senior Tournaments
 2001 – Americas Cup, Jamaica (3rd)
 2001 – World Cup Qualifier, Amiens/Abbeville, France (10th)
 2002 – Commonwealth Games, Manchester (7th)
 2003 – Pan American Games, Santo Domingo (5th)

References
 Profile

1979 births
Living people
Canadian female field hockey players
Field hockey players from Toronto